The International Union for Vacuum Science, Technique, and Applications (IUVSTA) is a union of 35 science and technology national member societies that supports collaboration in vacuum science, technique and applications.

Founded in 1958, IUVSTA is an interdisciplinary union which represents several thousands of physicists, chemists, materials scientists, engineers and technologists who are active in basic and applied research, development, manufacturing, sales and education. IUVSTA finances advanced scientific workshops, international schools and technical courses, worldwide.

The main purposes of the IUVSTA are to organize and sponsor international conferences and educational activities, as well as to facilitate research and technological developments in the field of vacuum science and its applications.

History 
The history and structure of the Union are described in two articles in scientific journals.

Membership 
IUVSTA is a Union (or federation) of National Vacuum Societies. There can be only one member society (or National Committee) in any one nation. This Society must be representative of the scientific and technical fields encompassed by the Divisions of IUVSTA. Where appropriate a Society can represent more than one nation. IUVSTA can only recognise societies in geographical areas recognised by the United Nations as independent nations.

Member Societies

Technical divisions 
Applied surface science
Biointerfaces
Electronic materials & processing
Nanometer structures
Plasma sciencce and technologies
Surface engineering 
Surface science
Thin film
Vacuum science and technology

Activities

Conference organization
 European Conference on Surface Science (ECOSS) annual series in collaboration with the European Physical Society.
 European Vacuum Conference series. Biennial. 
 International Thin Film Conference. 
 International Vacuum Congress and Exhibition, for all areas of activity of the Union. Triennial. 
 Vacuum and Surface Sciences Conference of Asia and Australia (VASSCAA). Biennial.

Workshops and education 
 Workshops on front-line research. 
 An education program for both technically developed and developing countries in the form of schools, webinars and technical training courses.

Standards and prizes
 Interaction with the International Organization for Standardization on the establishment of international vacuum standards.  
 The awarding of international prizes:
 The IUVSTA Prize for Science
 The IUVSTA Prize for Technology
 The IUVSTA EBARA Award
 The IUVSTA Medard W. Welch International Scholarship
 The IUVSTA Elsevier Student Travel Awards

External Affiliations 
IUVSTA maintains formal links with other Non-Government Organizations involved in education, and the promotion and dissemination of science and associated techniques. With the support of IUVSTA divisions, fruitful cooperation with UNESCO, ISC, ICTP and TWAS have been initiated and developed. Such contacts facilitate the organization of specialized workshops and may offer financial support for students attending short courses, seminars and congresses. Links with other organizations such as ISO are the responsibility of the IUVSTA divisions.

United Nations Educational, Scientific and Cultural Organization (UNESCO)
IUVSTA has been admitted to UNESCO in the “Relations Operationnelles” category.

International Science Council (ISC)
IUVSTA is a Scientific Associate of the International Science Council (formerly International Council of Scientific Unions, ICSU)

International Centre for Theoretical Physics (ICTP) 
IUVSTA cooperates financially and scientifically with International Centre for Theoretical Physics (ICTP) in the organization of workshops of high scientific level held in Trieste. These workshops address a post-graduate and post-doctoral audience from the lesser developed countries.

Third World Academy of Sciences (TWAS) 
Preliminary contacts have been made with Third World Academy of Sciences (TWAS) which foresees the organization of short courses on rough vacuum techniques and applications dedicated to technicians.

International Standards Organization (ISO)
IUVSTA has a formal liaison with the International Standards Organization (ISO). IUVSTA sends a representative to the TC/201 Surface Chemical Analysis committee and to the ISO TC/112 Vacuum Technology committee. These links are maintained via the Applied Surface Science and Vacuum Science and Technology divisions, respectively.

Structure and Organization

Current Primary Officers  
President:  François Reniers 
President Elect:  Jay Hendricks
Past President: Anouk Galtayries
Secretary General:  Christoph Eisenmenger-Sittner
Scientific Director:  Katsuyuki Fukutani
Scientific Secretary:  Anton Stampfl
Treasurer:  Arnaud Delcorte
Recording Secretary (non-voting officer):  Ana Gomes Silva

Current National Councillors

List of Presidents 
The President under the early federation was:
1958-1962 —  Prof. Dr. Emil Thomas

Past and present Presidents of IUVSTA:
2022-2025 —  Prof.François Reniers
2019-2022 —  Prof. Anouk Galtayries
2016-2019 —  Prof. Lars Montelius
2013-2016 —  Prof. Mariano Anderle
2010-2013 —  Prof. Jean Jacques Pireaux
2007-2010 —  Dr. J.W. "Bill" Rogers, Jr.
2004-2007 —  Prof. Ugo Valbusa
2001-2004 —  Dr. M.-G. Barthes-Labrousse
1998-2001 —  Prof. D. Phillip Woodruff
1995-1998 —  Prof. John L. Robins
1992-1995 —  Prof. Theodore E. Madey
1989-1992 —  Prof. Jose L. de Segovia
1986-1989 —  Prof. Dr. Heribert Jahrreiss
1983-1986 —  Prof. Dr. Janos Antal
1980-1983 —  Dr. James M. Lafferty
1977-1980 —  Prof. Dr. Leslie Holland
1974-1977 —  Dr. Albertus Venema
1971-1974 —  Dr. Luther E. Pruess
1968-1971 —  Prof. Dr. Kurt Diels
1965-1968 —  Prof. Dr. Jean Debiesse
1962-1965 —  Mr. Medard W. Welch

Honorary Presidents
2021 —  Peter Barna
1989 —  Prof. Dr. E. Thomas
1983 —  Prof. Dr. H.C. M. Auwärter
1977 —  Mr. M. W. Welch
1962 —  Prof. Dr. L. Dunoyer
1962 —  Prof. Dr. M. Pirani

Honorary and Founding Members of the Union
 Mr. A.S.D. Barrett
 Mlle. M. Berthaud
 Prof. D. Degras
 Prof. K. Diels
 Prof E. Thomas
 Dr. A. Venema
 Mr. M.W. Welch

References

External links
IUVSTA web site, iuvsta.org

Physics World August 2016, live.iop-pp01.agh.sleek.net . IUVSTA reflections. An Interview with Mariano Anderle, IUVSTA President 2013–2016.

Scientific organizations established in 1958
International scientific organizations
Vacuum
Plasma physics
Nanotechnology
International organisations based in Vienna
Non-profit organisations based in Austria
Members of the International Science Council